The Mod Squad is a 1999 American action thriller film directed by Scott Silver and starring Claire Danes, Omar Epps and Giovanni Ribisi. Based on the television show of the same name, actors Peggy Lipton and Clarence Williams III (Julie and Linc in the series) make cameo appearances.

Plot

Julie Barnes, Pete Cochran and Lincoln Hayes are three minor delinquents who choose to become undercover cops in place of serving their jail terms. When their superior Capt. Adam Greer is murdered, the trio set out to find the real culprits.

Cast
Claire Danes as Julie Barnes
Giovanni Ribisi as Pete Cochran
Omar Epps as Lincoln "Linc" Hayes
Dennis Farina as Capt. Adam Greer
Josh Brolin as Billy
Steve Harris as Briggs
Michael Lerner as Howard
Richard Jenkins as Bob Mothersed
Larry Brandenburg as Eckford
Lionel Mark Smith as Lanier
Sam McMurray as Tricky
Michael O'Neill as Greene
Stephen Kay as Bald Dude
Bodhi Elfman as Gilbert 
Holmes Osborne as Mr. Cochrane
Dey Young as Mrs. Cochrane
Eddie Griffin as Sonny
Clarence Williams III as Linc's Grandfather
Peggy Lipton as Julie's aunt

Production

Sarah Michelle Gellar, Melissa Joan Hart and Milla Jovovich were considered for the part of Julie Barnes, but they all passed until Claire Danes eventually got cast. Jonathan Dayton and Valerie Faris were offered the chance to direct the film, but turned it down in order to concentrate on making music videos instead; Scott Silver got the job.

Reception
The film was a box office bomb, grossing only $15.4 million out of its $50 million budget.   Audiences polled by CinemaScore gave the film an average grade of "C−" on an A+ to F scale.

Awards

The film was nominated for a Razzie Award for Worst Screenplay, but lost out to another television show turned movie: Wild Wild West. At the 1999 Stinkers Bad Movie Awards, the film was nominated for four awards: Worst Picture, Worst Actress (Danes), Worst Supporting Actor (Ribisi), and Worst Resurrection of a TV Show.

References

External links

 

The Mod Squad at Metacritic

1999 films
1990s crime films
1990s mystery films
American crime films
American mystery films
1990s English-language films
Films based on television series
Metro-Goldwyn-Mayer films
Films produced by Aaron Spelling
Films with screenplays by Scott Silver
1990s American films